Jan Woś (born 17 February 1974) is a Polish football manager and former player. He currently serves as an assistant coach for Ruch Chorzów.

References

External links
 

1974 births
Living people
Sportspeople from Świętokrzyskie Voivodeship
People from Busko County
Association football midfielders
Polish footballers
Odra Wodzisław Śląski players
Ruch Chorzów players
Dyskobolia Grodzisk Wielkopolski players
Skra Częstochowa players
Ekstraklasa players
I liga players
IV liga players
Polish football managers